Viva Birkett (14 February 1887 – 27 June 1934) was a British stage actress active on both sides of the Atlantic over the early decades of the twentieth century.

Early life and career
Valentine (originally recorded as Valentina) Viola Birkett was born on Saint Valentine's Day, 1887 at the historic coastal town of Exeter in the south west of England. She was the daughter of William Henry and Myra Martha Birkett, both natives of Exeter, where her father worked as a woollen merchant. Viva studied acting under the American thespian Kate Bateman (1842–1917) and made her London stage debut on 28 June 1906 as a guest performer at the Lyric Theatre in a revival of Monsieur Beaucaire and her New York City debut at the Hudson Theatre on 30 August of that same year playing Helen Plugenet in Hypocrites. For the remainder of her career she would continue to perform in London and New York and tour with companies headed by George Arliss, Sir Herbert Beerbohm Tree, and Henry Jowett. Her last Broadway  appearance was in June 1930 playing the Princess of San Luca in Death Takes a Holiday.

Marriage and family

On 23 July 1912, Viva married British actor Philip Merivale at St Marylebone Parish Church in London. The couple became the parents of two daughters and two sons, Rosamund, Valentine, John, and Philip.

Death

Viva Birkett died from cancer on 27 June 1934, less than a month after leaving New York to return to her home on Seymour Road in the London Borough of Richmond upon Thames. She was survived by her husband and children.

Selected performances
 1906: Monsieur Beaucaire adapted from the book by Booth Tarkington performed at the Lyric Theatre, London
 1906–07: Hypocrites by Henry Arthur Jones performed at the Hudson Theatre, New York
 1911: Twelfth Night  by William Shakespeare performed at His Majesty's Theatre, London.
 1911: The Merry Wives of Windsor (Anne Page) by William Shakespeare performed at His Majesty's Theatre, London.
 1911: Macbeth (Lady Macduff) by William Shakespeare performed at His Majesty's Theatre, London.
 1911–12: Peter Pan (Mrs. Darling) by J. M. Barrie performed at the Duke of York's Theatre, London
 1913: Trust the People (Lady Violet Ainslie) by Stanley Houghton performed at the Garrick Theatre, London
 1914: Trilby (Trilby O'Farrell) by George du Maurier
 1914: Evidence by J. duRocher MacPherson performed at the Lyric Theatre, New York
 1915: As You Like It (Rosalind) by William Shakespeare performed at the Boston Opera House, Boston, Massachusetts
 1916: Caroline by W. Somerset Maugham performed at the Empire Theatre, New York
 1919: The Mollusc (Mrs. Baker) by Hubert Henry Davies performed with the George Arliss Company
 1922: A Prince of Lovers (Lady Jersey) by Alice Ramsey
 1929–30: Death Takes a Holiday (Princess of San Luca) by Alberto Casella; adapted by Walter Ferris performed at the Ethel Barrymore Theatre, New York

Sources

External links
   NYPL Digital Gallery

British stage actresses
1887 births
1934 deaths
English stage actresses
English film actresses
English silent film actresses
20th-century English actresses
Actors from Exeter
Deaths from cancer in England